The Southland Conference's men's basketball tournament began in 1981, with the winner of the tournament receiving the conference's automatic bid into the NCAA Division I Men's Basketball Championship.

From 1981 to 2001, the first round of the tournament took place at the higher seed, with the remaining rounds at a set location. In 2002, the Southland changed the format to play games at the campus of sites of each higher seed, during every round of the tournament.  This was changed again in 2007, the first year that the conference selected a neutral site for all rounds of the tournament.

Starting with the 2023 edition, the event is held at The Legacy Center on the campus of McNeese State University in Lake Charles, Louisiana, reportedly as part of a deal that kept McNeese in the Southland after it had been courted by Conference USA and nearly joined the Western Athletic Conference. This move followed a 15-season run (2008–2022) at Leonard E. Merrell Center in the Houston suburb of Katy, Texas.

Tournament results

Note: Northeast Louisiana and Southwestern Louisiana became Louisiana–Monroe and Louisiana–Lafayette, respectively, in 1999; the latter has since changed its athletic branding to solely Louisiana. Southwest Texas State became Texas State in 2003.

Note on asterisks: Stephen F. Austin kept academically ineligible players from 2013-2020.

Performance by school

Note: Italics indicates former conference member as of the 2022–23 season.
Note on asterisks: Stephen F. Austin used academically ineligible players from 2013-2020.

All-Time Tournament Standings  

Italicized indicates former member as of the 2021–22 NCAA basketball season
Sources:

Television coverage

See also
Southland Conference women's basketball tournament

References

 
Recurring sporting events established in 1981